Hanover Township is one of the fifteen townships of Ashland County, Ohio, United States. As of the 2010 census the population was 2,050.

Geography
Located in the far southern part of the county, it borders the following townships:
Green Township - north
Washington Township, Holmes County - northeast
Knox Township, Holmes County - east
Jefferson Township, Knox County - southeast
Brown Township, Knox County - southwest
Worthington Township, Richland County - west
Monroe Township, Richland County - northwest corner

Part of the village of Loudonville is located in northeastern Hanover Township.

Name and history
Hanover Township began as a part of Richland County in 1806. Hanover Township was organized in 1818. It was separated to become a part of Ashland County upon its formation in 1846.

Statewide, other Hanover Townships are located in Butler, Columbiana, and Licking counties.

Government
The township is governed by a three-member board of trustees, who are elected in November of odd-numbered years to a four-year term beginning on the following January 1. Two are elected in the year after the presidential election and one is elected in the year before it. There is also an elected township fiscal officer, who serves a four-year term beginning on April 1 of the year after the election, which is held in November of the year before the presidential election. Vacancies in the fiscal officership or on the board of trustees are filled by the remaining trustees.

References

External links

County website

Townships in Ashland County, Ohio
1818 establishments in Ohio
Populated places established in 1818
Townships in Ohio